Sam McCorkle (born November 19, 1949) is former head football coach at both the University of West Alabama and the University of Tennessee at Martin. He grew up in Meridian, Mississippi and attended Livingston University (now the University of West Alabama) where he played center from 1970 to 1972. He began his coaching career in 1973 and held assistant coaching positions at North Texas State, Ole Miss, Vanderbilt, Livingston, Kentucky, Austin Peay, Mississippi Delta Community College and several high schools throughout Alabama. He served as the head coach of Etowah High School in Attalla, Alabama from 2009 to 2012. He is the offensive coordinator and offensive line coach at Oxford High School in Oxford, Mississippi.

Head coaching career
On December 19, 1984, McCorkle was hired to serve as head coach at Livingston from his assistant coach position at Vanderbilt. Never finishing higher than fourth in the Gulf South Conference standings, McCorkle resigned from his post on November 14, 1990. His overall record from 1985 to 1990 was 20 wins, 44 losses and two ties (20–44–2). After serving as an assistant coach as a number of schools, McCorkle returned to the head coaching ranks on December 7, 1999, when he was hired by the University of Tennessee at Martin. After a 2–6 start to the 2002 season, McCorkle was fired with Johnny Jernigan serving as interim head coach through the end of the season. His overall record from 2000 to 2002 was five wins and 25 losses (5–25).

Following Martin, McCorkle returned to West Alabama was an assistant coach. Following the resignation of Randy Pippin, he was promoted for a second stint as head coach at his alma mater in November 2003. After two seasons, McCorkle resigned following the 2005 season after compiling a record of four wins and 18 losses during his second tenure.

Head coaching record

College

See also
 List of college football head coaches with non-consecutive tenure

References

1949 births
Living people
American football centers
Austin Peay Governors football coaches
Kentucky Wildcats football coaches
North Texas Mean Green football coaches
Ole Miss Rebels football coaches
UT Martin Skyhawks football coaches
Vanderbilt Commodores football coaches
West Alabama Tigers football coaches
West Alabama Tigers football players
High school football coaches in Alabama
High school football coaches in Florida
High school football coaches in Mississippi
Junior college football coaches in the United States
People from Big Stone Gap, Virginia